Scalicus orientalis  is a species of marine ray-finned fish belonging to the family Peristediidae, the armoured gurnards or armored sea robins. This species is found in Indian Ocean and western Pacific Ocean.

Taxonomy
Scalicus orientalis was first formally desceribed as Nemaperistedion orientale in 1938 by the American zoologist Henry Weed Fowler with its type locality give as off Makian Island, between Gillolo and Makian Islands in Indonesia. The specific name orientalis means "eastern".

Description
Scalicus orientalis is pale pinkish-brown in colour becoming paler on the lower body with a scattering of variably sized but small brown spots on the head and body. The front portion of the first dorsal fin is blackish, as are the two large filamentous barbels on the lower jaw, and the long, triangular rostral projections.

Distribution and habitat
Scalicus orientalis is found in theIndo-Pacific from Réunion and the Arabian Sea east to New Caledonia, north to Japan and south to northern Australia. In Australia it is found from the southwest of the Scott and Seringapatam Reefs and from Innisfall to Coolangatta in Queensland.

References

orientalis
Fish described in 1938